Kaippattur is a village in the Ernakulam district of Kerala, India. It is located in the Kanayannur taluk.

Demographics 

According to the 2011 census of India, Kaippattur has 1579 households. The literacy rate of the village is 87.99%.

References 

Villages in Kanayannur taluk